Godfrey House and Barn Complex is a historic home and barn complex located at Lima in Livingston County, New York. The farmhouse was built in about 1853 and is a two-story, three bay wide by three bay deep, frame Italianate style dwelling.  In addition to the farmhouse, there are four contributing buildings and two structures dating from the 1850s to the 1930s.  They include two barns, a milk house, a chicken house, garage, and a silo.

It was listed on the National Register of Historic Places in 1989.

References

Houses on the National Register of Historic Places in New York (state)
Italianate architecture in New York (state)
Houses in Livingston County, New York
National Register of Historic Places in Livingston County, New York